Kurt Grønning (born 5 August 1936) is a Danish footballer. He played in four matches for the Denmark national football team from 1963 to 1964.

References

External links
 

1936 births
Living people
Danish men's footballers
Denmark international footballers
Place of birth missing (living people)
Association footballers not categorized by position